is a Japanese manga series written and illustrated by Hikaru Yuzuki. It was serialized in Shueisha's seinen manga magazine Business Jump from 1990 to 2011, with its chapters collected in forty tankōbon volumes. A sequel, Amai Seikatsu: 2nd Season, started in Grand Jump in November 2011.

Story
The story is about a young part-timer, Shinosuke, and his rise in the lingerie company "PIXY". He was found by the eccentric CEO (Shōzō Hino), when Shinosuke was returning a pair of old ladies underwear that was sent to the wrong department. Later, it's discovered that Shinosuke has an odd “talent”. He is able to merely touch a lady and know if she is wearing the right or wrong lingerie and can even tell her measurements. His touch also causes a pleasurable sensation to the ladies and they come back for more.  Shinosuke does not understand this due to his innocence and “purity”.  As the story progresses a romance develops between Shinosuke and Yumika Wakamiya, the private secretary to Hino.

Characters
 
 Shinosuke is a 21-year-old man who works as lingerie designer.

Publication
Written and illustrated by Hikaru Yuzuki, Amai Seikatsu was serialized in Shueisha's seinen manga magazine Business Jump from 1990 to 2011. Its chapters were collected in 40 tankōbon volumes, released from December 13, 1990, to August 19, 2011.

A sequel, titled Amai Seikatsu: 2nd Season, started in Shueisha's Grand Jump magazine on November 16, 2011. Shueisha released its first volume on April 19, 2012. As of January 19, 2022, 15 volumes have been released.

See also
 Minna Agechau, another manga series by the same author

References

External links
  
 

Romantic comedy anime and manga
Seinen manga
Shueisha franchises
Shueisha manga